Donegall Quay is a public park and greenspace located in Belfast. It borders with Obel Tower and the River Lagan.

References

Parks in Belfast